Ryumon Dam is a concrete gravity dam located in Saga Prefecture in Japan. The dam is used for water supply. The catchment area of the dam is 3.2 km2. The dam impounds about 16  ha of land when full and can store 2350 thousand cubic meters of water. The construction of the dam was started on 1968 and completed in 1975.

References

Dams in Saga Prefecture
1975 establishments in Japan